Princess Eugénie of Greece and Denmark (10 February 1910 – 13 February 1989) was the youngest child and only daughter of Prince George of Greece and Denmark and his wife, Princess Marie Bonaparte, daughter of Marie-Félix Blanc and Prince Roland Bonaparte, a great-nephew of Napoleon I. Her father was the second son of George I of Greece and Olga Constantinovna of Russia.

As a cousin of the bridegroom, she was a leading guest at the 1947 wedding of Princess Elizabeth and Philip, Duke of Edinburgh.

She authored Le Tsarevitch, Enfant Martyr, a biography of Aleksey Nikolaevich, Tsarevich of Russia, written in French, which was published in 1990.

Marriage and issue
She married Prince Dominik Rainer Radziwiłł, member of the House of Radziwiłł, on 30 May 1938 in Paris. They divorced in 1946. They had two children:

Princess Tatiana Radziwiłł (b. 28 August 1939); married Dr. Jean Henri Fruchaud. and has issue. Tatiana was a bridesmaid at the 1962 wedding of Prince Juan Carlos of Spain and Princess Sophia of Greece and Denmark as well as the 1964 wedding of Constantine II of Greece and Princess Anne-Marie of Denmark
Prince Jerzy (George) Andrzej Dominik Hieronim Piotr Leon Radziwiłł (4 November 1942 – 27 August 2001).

Eugénie remarried on 28 November 1949 to Prince Raymundo della Torre e Tasso, Duke of Castel Duino, a cadet member of the House of Thurn and Taxis. Their marriage also ended in divorce, in 1965. They had one son:
Prince Carlo Alessandro della Torre e Tasso, Duke di Castel Duino (b. 10 February 1952); married Veronique Lantz and had issue.

Ancestry

Honours 
 Dame Grand Cross of the Order of Saints Olga and Sophia

References

Descendants of William the Conqueror

Danish princesses
Greek princesses
House of Glücksburg (Greece)
1910 births
1989 deaths
Princesses of Thurn und Taxis
Nobility from Paris
French people of German descent
French people of Danish descent
Winners of the Prix Broquette-Gonin (literature)
French people of Greek descent
French people of Russian descent